Waldo Henry Rogers (May 17, 1908 – January 12, 1964) was a United States district judge of the United States District Court for the District of New Mexico.

Education and career

Born in Las Vegas, New Mexico, Rogers received an Artium Baccalaureus degree from the University of Colorado Boulder in 1930 and a Bachelor of Laws from the University of Colorado School of Law in 1931. He was in private practice in New Mexico from 1931 to 1947. He was an assistant district attorney of the Second Judicial District of New Mexico in 1932. He was a Captain in the United States Army during World War II, from 1942 to 1945. He was city attorney of Albuquerque, New Mexico from 1947 to 1951. He was a Judge of the Second District Court, Division 1 in New Mexico from 1951 to 1954.

Federal judicial service

Rogers was nominated by President Dwight D. Eisenhower on May 3, 1954, to the United States District Court for the District of New Mexico, to a new seat authorized by 68 Stat. 8. He was confirmed by the United States Senate on May 13, 1954, and received his commission on May 15, 1954. He served as Chief Judge from 1963 to 1964. His service terminated on January 12, 1964, due to his death.

References

Sources
 

1908 births
1964 deaths
Judges of the United States District Court for the District of New Mexico
United States district court judges appointed by Dwight D. Eisenhower
20th-century American judges
United States Army officers
People from Las Vegas, New Mexico
University of Colorado Boulder alumni
University of Colorado Law School alumni